In Ohio, State Route 76 may refer to:
Interstate 76 in Ohio, the only Ohio highway numbered 76 since about 1972
Ohio State Route 76 (1923-1960), now SR 83 (Avon Lake to Beverly) and SR 339 (Beverly to Belpre)